Jo Stafford's Sweet Hour of Prayer (1964) is a studio album of inspirational songs recorded by American singer Jo Stafford on Capitol Records T/ST-2096.

Track listing

 Count Your Blessings
 How Great Thou Art
 Whiter Than Snow
 Little Brown Church in the Wildwood
 A Mighty Fortress Is Our God
 My Task
 Sweet By and By
 Sweet Hour of Prayer
What a Friend We Have in Jesus
 When the Roll is Called up Yonder
 I Love To Tell the Story
 The Ninety and Nine

References

Jo Stafford albums
Capitol Records albums
1964 albums
Contemporary Christian music albums by American artists